Fort Hyndshaw was a fort in Middle Smithfield Township, Monroe County, Pennsylvania, built in 1755 and 1756 during the French and Indian War.

The need for fortifications
In response to an increasing number of attacks in Pennsylvania by French troops in the western part of the state and by Indian hostilities close to Philadelphia, the Pennsylvania Legislature placed Benjamin Franklin and James Hamilton in charge to erect a chain of forts along the Blue Mountain in the Minisink region .

Franklin, via a letter dated January 12, 1756 to Captain James Van Etten, ordered him to "proceed immediately to raise a Company of Foot, consisting of 30 able Men, including two Serjeants, with which you are to protect the Inhabitants of Upper Smithfield assisting them while they thresh out and secure their Corn, and scouting from time to time as you judge necessary on the Outside of the Settlements."

Origin of the name
The Fort was named after Lieutenant James Hyndshaw (1720-1770), who was born in Ulster County, New York and was married to Maria Dupui/Dupuy, a niece of Nicholas Dupuy, one of the earliest European settlers of Monroe County, whose home became Fort Dupuy during the French and Indian War around the same time as Fort Hyndshaw. Hyndshaw was second in command to Van Etten.

Structure and history
A 70-foot square blockade was built around Hyndshaw's home.  The Fort was active for a little over a year, at which point it was apparently abandoned. Since the fort was made of wood, it deteriorated over time.
In 2003 a replacement historical marker was erected by the Pennsylvania Historical and Museum Commission.

References

External links 
Pennsylvania Archives, Volume 3
The Poconos: An Illustrated Natural History Guide  By Carl S. Oplinger 
Mary H. Overfield France-Rice  Overfield History 
Robert Mack Wallace  Ebenezer! Or, Memorial Discourse, Commemorative of the Founding and Progress of the First Presbyterian Church of Stroudsburg, Pa

French and Indian War forts
Forts in Pennsylvania
Colonial forts in Pennsylvania
Benjamin Franklin
History of Monroe County, Pennsylvania
Infrastructure completed in 1756
1756 establishments in Pennsylvania